The North Dakota Legacy fund is a sovereign wealth fund. Contributions to the fund are calculated from a thirty percent tax on oil extraction and production. The fund was established by ballot initiative in 2010. The fund is modeled after the Norwegian Sovereign Wealth Fund. As of May 2022, the fund has a principal balance of approximately $7.675 billion. The fund is projected to have assets worth approximately $90 billion by 2039, $150 billion by 2050, and $250 billion by 2060. The fund intends to diversify wealth obtained from oil extraction into other sectors. Money in the fund could not be spent by the state legislature until 2017.

Background

North Dakota is a commodity-based economy. North Dakota experienced an uptick in oil extraction from 2008-2014. The legacy fund was established to ensure that the financial windfall gained from the Bakken Oil Boom would benefit the state in the long-run, even if oil prices collapse.

References 

Sovereign wealth funds
2010 establishments in North Dakota
Oil fields in North Dakota
Economy of North Dakota
Oil booms